The 2011 Copa Claro was a men's tennis tournament played on outdoor clay courts. It was the 14th edition of the Copa Claro, and was part of the ATP World Tour 250 series of the 2011 ATP World Tour. It took place in Buenos Aires, Argentina, from February 14 through February 20, 2011. Nicolás Almagro won the singles title.

Finals

Singles

 Nicolás Almagro defeated  Juan Ignacio Chela 6–3, 3–6, 6–4.
It was Almagro's 2nd title of the year and 9th of his career.

Doubles

 Oliver Marach /  Leonardo Mayer defeated  Franco Ferreiro /  André Sá, 7–6(8–6), 6–3

Entrants

Seeds

 Rankings are as of February 7, 2011.

Other entrants
The following players received wildcards into the main draw:
 José Acasuso
 Federico del Bonis
 Máximo González

The following players received entry from the qualifying draw:

 Juan Pablo Brzezicki
 Pablo Galdón
 Iván Navarro
 Albert Ramos-Viñolas

References

External links
Official website
ITF tournament details

Copa Claro
ATP Buenos Aires
Copa Claro
Copa Claro